Cultic is an extreme metal band from Yoe, Pennsylvania. The band coined the term, "Dark Dungeon Metal," to describe their music which takes influence from early death-doom, first wave black metal, and punk rock and combines it with dungeon synth interludes and dark fantasy themes.

History 
Cultic was formed in 2016 by husband and wife – Brian Magar (guitar/vocals) and Rebecca Magar (drums), whose initial creative vision was to expand on the sounds and aesthetics of Winter, Hellhammer, and Celtic Frost. Cultic's frontman, guitarist and vocalist Brian Magar, experimented with extreme music at a young age, starting his first band, Septic Waste at only 11 years old. He would go on to contribute to a variety of extreme music projects including Guntgrutcher, Layr, Albatwitch, The Owls Are Not What They Seem, and Poison Wind.

Cultic co-founder and drummer Rebecca Magar, became involved in the underground music scene as an illustrator and artist. Going under the moniker Wailing Wizard, she produced album covers, t-shirts, and promotional materials for a variety of bands, events, and fringe artistic projects. She also joined The Owls Are Not What They Seem as a percussionist on the album Feral Blood before becoming a founding member of Cultic.

On August 9, 2017, Cultic released their first self-recorded demo titled, Prowler, digitally and on CD. Prowler included two songs, "Cruel Orders" and "The Prowler", that would ultimately reappear on their first full-length album High Command.

After the release of their demo, Cultic was joined by bassist Reese Harlacker (of Wrath of Typhon, Bittered, and Poison Wind). Together, they wrote, recorded, and produced High Command, which includes guest vocals by Jason Robison (of Wrath of Typhon). High Command was released digitally and on CD through Eleventh Key Records on April 5, 2019.

Their second album, Of Fire and Sorcery, was released on April 22, 2022. It introduced dungeon synth interludes and expanded on the conceptual stories from their first release High Command. The album covers from High Command and Of Fire and Sorcery can be positioned side-by-side to form a dyptich (the band plans to continue this format for their future full-length releases).

Reese Harlacker moved in 2021, making the band a two-piece again until 2022 when they were joined by bassist Andrew Harris (formerly of Warhawk, Witch Hazel, and Alms).

Discography

Full-length albums 
 High Command (April 5, 2019)
 Of Fire and Sorcery (April 22, 2022)

Demos 
 Prowler (August 19, 2017)

Music videos 
 "Forest of Knives" (2019)
 "Beseech the Olden Throne" (2022)

References

External links 
 Official Website
 Interview with No Clean Singing, October 4, 2022
 "Fistful Of Questions With Brian Magar From Cultic," August 14, 2022

American doom metal musical groups
Heavy metal musical groups from Pennsylvania
American death metal musical groups
American black metal musical groups
Musical groups established in 2016